Stoyan Angelov Pilichev (Стоян Ангелов Пиличев, born November 20, 1938, Chiroko, Bulgaria) was a Bulgarian boxer who competed in the lightweight category at the 1964 and 1968 Summer Olympics, as a member of the Bulgarian national boxing team. In the 1964 Summer Olympics he lost to Józef Grudzień from Poland in the quarter-final. In the 1968 Summer Olympics he lost to Calistrat Cuțov from Romania in the quarter-final. Pilichev represented Bulgaria in the lightweight category of the 1969 European Amateur Boxing Championships. After reaching the final, he faced Calistrat Cuțov from Romania, in a rematch of 1968 Mexico City quarter-final, and he lost on points, resulting in winning the silver medal of the division.

References

Olympic boxers of Bulgaria
Boxers at the 1964 Summer Olympics
Boxers at the 1968 Summer Olympics
1938 births
Living people
Bulgarian male boxers
Lightweight boxers